Charley Jordan (July 11, 1890 – November 15, 1954) was an American St. Louis blues singer, songwriter and guitarist, as well as a talent scout, originally from Mabelvale, Arkansas, United States.  He was known for a unique style that drew on his rural roots.

The Killer Blues Headstone Project placed a headstone for Charley Jordan.

Life and career
Jordan recorded numerous singles for Vocalion and Decca between 1930 and 1937, and also performed with some well-regarded bluesmen from the 1920s to the 1940s.  Jordan played with Peetie Wheatstraw, Roosevelt Sykes, Casey Bill Weldon and Memphis Minnie. Noted for his "crisply firm guitar", he had most of his biggest hits, including "Keep It Clean", in the early to mid-1930s.   Later in that decade and into the 1940s, he worked frequently with Big Joe Williams.

Spinal injury
In 1928, Jordan was shot in the spine, this was due to his extramusical career as a bootlegger. This gave him a long term disability and caused him to walk with crutches thereafter (which can be seen in the few photographs of Jordan available).

Jordan died of pneumonia or violence in 1954 in St. Louis, Missouri.

Discography
A partial discography is available online.

Songs
"Big Four Blues"
"Got Your Water On Blues"
"Crazy With the Blues"
"Dollar Bill Blues"
"Honeysucker Blues"
"Hunkie Tunkie Blues"
"I Couldn't Stay Here"
"Just a Spoonful"
"Keep It Clean"
"Raidin' Squad Blues"
"Stack O'Dollars Blues"

Compilations
1992 - Charlie Jordan Vol. 1, 1930 - 1931 - Document
1992 - Charlie Jordan Vol. 2, 1931 - 1934 - Document
1992 - Charlie Jordan Vol. 3, 1935 - 1937 - Document
2004 - The Essential Charley Jordan - Classic Blues

References

Other sources
 
 
 Charlie Jordan Vol. 1, 1930 - 1931 : sleeve notes on Charley Jordan

External links
 Rokkets Discography
 Illustrated Charley Jordan discography

1890 births
1954 deaths
People from Pulaski County, Arkansas
Country blues musicians
American blues guitarists
American male guitarists
American blues singer-songwriters
Singer-songwriters from Arkansas
Vocalion Records artists
Deaths from pneumonia in Missouri
St. Louis blues musicians
American bootleggers
20th-century American singers
20th-century American guitarists
Guitarists from Arkansas
20th-century American male singers
American male singer-songwriters